The 2012 Bridgepoint Education Holiday Bowl, the 35th edition of the game, was a postseason American college football bowl game between the Baylor Bears from the Big 12 Conference and the UCLA Bruins from the Pac-12 Conference (Pac-12), played on December 27, 2012, at Qualcomm Stadium in San Diego, California. The game was the final contest of the 2012 NCAA Division I-Football Bowl Subdivision (Division I-FBS) football season for both teams. The game kicked off at 6:45 p.m. PT and was broadcast on both ESPN TV and ESPN Radio. This is the first Holiday Bowl appearance for both Baylor and UCLA, as well as the first-ever meeting between the two teams. It also marks the first time one of the Pac-12's Southern California teams has played in the Holiday Bowl.

Teams

Baylor

The Baylor Bears, winning their last three games, are among the best in the country, averaging 578.8 yards per game (first), averaging 353.3 yards passing (third), and averaging 44.1 points per game (fifth). They defeated then-No. 1 ranked Kansas State Wildcats 52–24 on November 17. Its Quarterback Nick Florence has passed for 4,121 yards for 31 touchdowns this season, and rushed for a gain of 531 yards and nine touchdowns.
 Baylor is rated 117th in the country in scoring defense, allowing 62 touchdowns, 8 field goals for 458 points.

UCLA

For the third time this season, the UCLA Bruins will be playing against a team that has defeated a No. 1 ranked team in the country. They lost the last two games to the Stanford Cardinal who defeated the then No. 1 rated Oregon Ducks on November 17.

The Bruins are led by quarterback Brett Hundley and senior running back Johnathan Franklin. Franklin, the school's all-time leading rusher, has carried the ball 268 times for 1,700 yards and 13 touchdowns. He also has 32 receptions for 319 yards. Hundley has completed 292 passes for 3411 yards and for 26 touchdowns. Additionally, he has run for 365 yards for nine touchdowns.
 
Defensively, UCLA is led by Eric Kendricks and Anthony Barr. Kendricks is fifth in the nation with 137 tackles and has 10 or more tackles in eight games this season. Barr leads the nation with 13.5 sacks and has 20.5 total tackles for loss. He is credited with four forced fumbles and two blocked kicks.

Game summary

Scoring summary

Statistics

Game notes
 December 6, 2012 – Johnathan Franklin was voted second best running back in the nation in the Doak Walker Award, finishing just behind Montee Ball of Wisconsin.
The Bruins' final touchdown was not reviewed during the game, but replays appeared to show that Logan Sweet was down at the 1-yard line on what was ruled a 34-yard touchdown catch. While the score of the game was 49–26, Baylor Head Coach Art Briles had the score changed to 49–19 on the championship rings presented to Baylor players commemorating the victory. Chip Patterson of CBSSports.com called the changing of the score "an arrogant move."

References

Holiday Bowl
Holiday Bowl
Baylor Bears football bowl games
UCLA Bruins football bowl games
Holiday Bowl
December 2012 sports events in the United States